Copelatus ornatipennis is a species of diving beetle. It is part of the genus Copelatus in the subfamily Copelatinae of the family Dytiscidae. It was described by Zimmermann in 1926.

References

ornatipennis
Beetles described in 1926